The 2016 AFF U-19 Youth Championship was the 14th edition of the AFF U-19 Youth Championship, organised by the ASEAN Football Federation, and known for sponsorship reasons as the AFF Vietcombank U19 Championship. It was hosted by Vietnam for the sixth time after the 2007, 2009, 2010, 2012 and 2014 editions. It was played from 11 to 24 September 2016.  Eleven out of the twelve member associations of the ASEAN Football Federation took part in the tournament featuring two groups of five and six teams.

Venues

Squads

Participating teams

Group stage
 All matches were held in Hanoi, Vietnam.
 All times are local, ICT (UTC+7).

Group A

Group B

Knockout stage

Semi-finals

Third place match

Final

Winner

Goalscorers
6 goals

 George Blackwood

5 goals

 Supachai Jaided

4 goals

 Maitee Hatsady
 Muhammad Jafri
 Worachit Kanitsribampen
 Saddil Ramdani

3 goals

 Lachlan Scott
 Mario Shabow
 Long Phearath
 Aung Kaung Mann
 Shwe Ko
 Rufino Gama
 Hà Đức Chinh

2 goals

 Joe Champness
 Steve Kuzmanovski
 Dejan Pandurevic
 Dimas Drajad
 Pandi Lestaluhu
 Zwee Thet Paing
 Jakkit Wachpirom
 Sittichok Paso
 Frangcyatma Alves
 Tống Anh Tỷ
 Nguyễn Tiến Linh
 Trần Thành

1 goal

 Keanu Baccus
 Jayden Prasad
 In Sodavid
 Kunthea Ravan
 Sep Rosib
 Yue Safy
 Bagas Adi Nugroho
 Sandi Pratama
 Muhammad Rafli
 Khamphanh Sonthanalay
 Santi Somphoupeth
 Vanna Bounlovongsa
 Syamer Kutty Abba
 Muhammad Amirul
 Muhammad Kamarudin
 Mohd Zarulizwan Mazlan
 Badrul Rusalan
 Danial Ashraf
 Aung Naing Win
 Jeremiah Borlongan
 Major Ebarle
 Jordan Jarvis
 Kintaro Miyagi
 Mark Winhoffer
 Syahrul Sazali
 Haiqal Pashia
 Sorawit Panthong
 Wisarut Imura
 Suksan Mungpao
 Henrique Cruz
 Gaudencio Monteiro
 Gelvanio Alberto
 José Oliveira
 Trương Tiến Anh
 Lê Ngọc Bảo
 Trần Duy Khánh
 Đoàn Văn Hậu
 Phan Thanh Hậu
 Huỳnh Tấn Sinh

Own goals
 Cheng Meng (playing against Australia)
 Ouk Sovann (playing against Myanmar)
 Ariyapol Chanson (playing against Myanmar)
 Saringkan Promsupa (playing against Cambodia)

References

External links

2016 in AFF football
AFF U-19 Youth Championship
International association football competitions hosted by Vietnam
2016 in Vietnamese football
Sport in Hanoi
September 2016 sports events in Asia
2016 in youth association football
21st century in Hanoi